Rakwool was an Australian racehorse who carried 73 kg (11 st 7 lbs) to win the Grand National Steeplechase at Flemington by 20 lengths in 1931. His racing career was ended by injury at the age of six.

Background
Rakwool was a bay gelding sired by Woorak, an Australian stallion whose best offspring was the Caulfield Cup winner, Whittier. His dame, Wollumqua, had produced four previous winners and went on to foal Precocious, which won the VRC Grand National in 1932. Wollumqua was sold for 625 guineas by her owner A. E. Tyson, to E. Y. Shiel when pregnant with the foal who would be named Rakwool. The horse's earliest training was handled by Shiel's daughter, Dorothy.

Racing career

Hurdle race
His first hurdle win was at Moonee Valley, when he surged to the lead from the outset and won. During the race, he accidentally caused the death of jockey Hughie Cairns.

Steeplechases
In June 1931, Rakwool won the Prince of Wales Steeplechase at Melbourne under a weight of 11 st 12 lbs and carried 12 st 7 lbs to victory in the Wanda Steeplechase. In July, he recorded his most significant win in the Victorian Grand National. Carrying 11 st 7 lbs he reportedly outjumped and outstayed the opposition to win. A week later, Rakwool carried 13st 2 lbs in the Godfrey Watson Steeplechase at Caulfield Racecourse in July, in which he sustained a career-ending injury. He began his leap much too far from the last fence and landed on the near side of it with his chest, throwing his rider clear. Rakwool turned a complete somersault and it was feared he had broken his back. 
He jarred his entire body and was partly paralysed for many weeks. But he recovered enough to enjoy his retirement to the paddock.

See also
 List of historical horses

References 

1925 racehorse births
Racehorses bred in Australia
Racehorses trained in Australia
Non-Thoroughbred racehorses